Joshua Safdie (born April 3, 1984) and Benjamin Safdie (born February 24, 1986) are independent American filmmakers and actors based in New York City, who frequently collaborate on their films. They are best known for writing and directing the crime thriller films Good Time (2017) starring Robert Pattinson and Uncut Gems (2019) starring Adam Sandler.

In addition to writing and directing, both Josh and Benny serve in a variety of key positions including acting, editing, shooting, mixing sound, and producing their films. They have also frequently collaborated with Ronald Bronstein, who has co-written and edited all of their narrative features beginning with the 2009 film Daddy Longlegs. Other recurring collaborators include composer Oneohtrix Point Never, cinematographer Sean Price Williams and production designer Sam Lisenco.

Early life
The Safdie brothers were raised in New York, the children of Amy and Alberto Safdie. They spent their childhood living between their father in Queens and their mother and stepfather in Manhattan. The Safdie brothers are Jewish. Their father, who is a Sephardic Jew of Syrian-Jewish descent, was raised in France and in Italy. Their mother is an Ashkenazi Jew of Russian-Jewish descent.

They began making films at a young age, inspired by their film-enthusiast father, Alberto. They graduated from Columbia Grammar & Preparatory School in Manhattan. At Boston University, they co-founded the creative collective Red Bucket Films with Alex Kalman, Sam Lisenco, Brett Jutkiewicz,  and Zachary Treitz. Josh and Benny Safdie graduated from Boston University College of Communication in 2007 and 2008, respectively. They claim "turmoil of their youth", as children of divorced parents, became an inspiration for later work. Famed Israeli-Canadian architect Moshe Safdie is their great uncle, and they are also related to his son, playwright Oren Safdie.

The brothers grew up as fans of basketball and the New York Knicks. The duo try to watch every game together. Basketball is prominently featured in Lenny Cooke and Uncut Gems.

Career

The Pleasure of Being Robbed
In 2007, Josh Safdie was hired by Andy Spade and Anthony Sperduti to create a short film featuring Kate Spade Handbags. He devised a concise story about the adventures of a kleptomaniac woman. Eleonore Hendricks, who co-wrote the screenplay, portrayed the lead role. The project eventually turned into a feature film. The film, titled The Pleasure of Being Robbed, had its world premiere at the 2008 South by Southwest. It also screened in the Directors' Fortnight section at the 2008 Cannes Film Festival, along with a short film The Acquaintances of a Lonely John directed by Benny Safdie.

Daddy Longlegs
Their second feature film, Daddy Longlegs, had its world premiere under the title Go Get Some Rosemary in the Directors' Fortnight section at the 2009 Cannes Film Festival. Starring Ronald Bronstein, it was inspired by the filmmakers' younger years living with their father, Albert. Bronstein won the Breakthrough Actor Award at the Gotham Independent Film Awards 2010. The film won the John Cassavetes Award at the 26th Independent Spirit Awards.

Lenny Cooke
Their first full-length documentary film, Lenny Cooke, follows the life of Lenny Cooke, a once phenom high school basketball player, from adolescence to manhood. The film premiered at the 2013 Tribeca Film Festival.

Heaven Knows What
In 2014, the Safdie Brothers produced Heaven Knows What under their Elara Pictures banner. The film centers around the real-life stories written in a book titled Mad Love in New York City by lead actress Arielle Holmes. The film had its world premiere at the 71st Venice International Film Festival. It also screened at the Toronto International Film Festival, the New York Film Festival, and the Tokyo International Film Festival.

Good Time
The Safdies directed the 2017 crime film Good Time, starring Robert Pattinson and Benny Safdie as siblings. The film was selected to compete for the Palme d'Or in the main competition section at the 2017 Cannes Film Festival.

Uncut Gems

The Safdies directed Uncut Gems, starring Adam Sandler, with Martin Scorsese serving as an executive producer. The film was inspired by their father's time working in the Manhattan Diamond District. It had its world premiere at the 2019 Telluride Film Festival. Theatrically released in the United States in 2019, it received critical acclaim and became one of A24's highest-grossing releases.

Future projects
In December 2017, The Hollywood Reporter announced that the Safdies would helm a remake of 48 Hrs. with the script being written by Josh Safdie, Ronald Bronstein, and Jerrod Carmichael. In December 2019, the Safdies elaborated in an interview with The A.V. Club, saying the film was still being made but it would no longer be a remake. Their script would instead be "re-shifted into something original."

In February 2020, Showtime ordered a pilot for The Curse, a parody of HGTV starring Nathan Fielder and Benny Safdie. Fielder is set to co-write the show with the Safdies, and both brothers are to co-direct.

In April 2022, it was reported by IndieWire that the Safdies would be reteaming with Sandler for a new project.

Elara Pictures
The Safdies are co-founders of Elara Pictures, a production company founded in 2014. The company produced the Safdies' feature films Heaven Knows What, Good Time, and Uncut Gems, Owen Kline's feature film directorial debut Funny Pages, and the HBO television series Chillin Island.

Filmography

Feature films

Short films

Producers

Josh as an actor

Music videos

Awards and nominations

Influences
Their artistic influences included the cinematic works of John Cassavetes, Martin Scorsese and Quentin Tarantino as well as underground comix artist Robert Crumb and author Irvine Welsh.

Benny named Robert Bresson's A Man Escaped as his favorite film of all time, and Josh named Vittorio De Sica’s Bicycle Thieves as his favorite.

References

External links

 
 
 Red Bucket Films

1984 births
1986 births
Living people
20th-century American Jews
American people of Russian-Jewish descent
American people of Syrian-Jewish descent
Boston University College of Communication alumni
Columbia Grammar & Preparatory School alumni
Film directors from New York City
Filmmaking duos
Independent Spirit Award for Best Director winners
People from Manhattan
People from Queens, New York
American Ashkenazi Jews
American Sephardic Jews
American Mizrahi Jews
Sibling filmmakers
21st-century American Jews